United Nations Security Council Resolution 379, adopted on November 2, 1975, considered a report by the Secretary General relating to the situation concerning Western Sahara.  The council reaffirmed resolution 377, General Assembly resolution 1514 and noted the grave situation with concern.

The resolution urges all parties concerned and interested to avoid an action which might further escalate the tension in the area and requests the Secretary-General to continue and intensify his consultations with the interested parties and to report back as soon as possible.

No details of the vote were given, other than that it was "adopted by consensus".

See also
Green March
List of United Nations Security Council Resolutions 301 to 400 (1971–1976)
United Nations visiting mission to Spanish Sahara
Western Sahara War

References
Text of the Resolution at undocs.org

External links
 

 0379
 0379
November 1975 events